NAPQI, also known as NAPBQI or N-acetyl-p-benzoquinone imine, is a toxic byproduct produced during the xenobiotic metabolism of the analgesic paracetamol (acetaminophen). It is normally produced only in small amounts, and then almost immediately detoxified in the liver.

However, under some conditions in which NAPQI is not effectively detoxified (usually in the case of paracetamol overdose), it causes severe damage to the liver. This becomes apparent 3–4 days after ingestion and may result in death from fulminant liver failure several days after the overdose.

Metabolism 

In adults, the primary metabolic pathway for paracetamol is glucuronidation. This yields a relatively non-toxic metabolite, which is excreted into bile and passed out of the body. A small amount of the drug is metabolized via the cytochrome P-450 pathway (to be specific, CYP3A4 and CYP2E1) into NAPQI, which is extremely toxic to liver tissue, as well as being a strong biochemical oxidizer.  In an average adult, only a small amount (approximately 10% of a therapeutic paracetamol dose) of NAPQI is produced, which is inactivated by conjugation with glutathione (GSH).  The amount of NAPQI produced differs in certain populations.

The minimum dosage at which paracetamol causes toxicity usually is 7.5 to 10g in the average person. The lethal dose is usually between 10 g and 15 g.  Concurrent alcohol intake lowers these thresholds significantly.  Chronic alcoholics may be more susceptible to adverse effects due to reduced glutathione levels.  Other populations may experience effects at lower or higher dosages depending on differences in P-450 enzyme activity and other factors which affect the amount of NAPQI produced.  In general, however, the primary concern is accidental or intentional paracetamol overdose.

When a toxic dose of paracetamol is ingested, the normal glucuronide pathway is saturated and large amounts of NAPQI are produced.  Liver reserves of glutathione are depleted by conjugation with this excess NAPQI.  The mechanism by which toxicity results is complex, but is believed to involve reaction between unconjugated NAPQI and critical proteins as well as increased susceptibility to oxidative stress caused by the depletion of glutathione.

Poisoning 
The prognosis is good for paracetamol overdoses if treatment is initiated up to 8 hours after the drug has been taken. Most hospitals stock the antidote (acetylcysteine), which replenishes the liver's supply of glutathione, allowing the NAPQI to be metabolized safely. Without early administration of the antidote, fulminant liver failure follows, often in combination with kidney failure, and death generally occurs within several days.

Mechanism and antidote
NAPQI becomes toxic when GSH is depleted by an overdose of acetaminophen,  Glutathione is an essential antidote to overdose. Glutathione conjugates to NAPQI and helps to detoxify it. In this capacity, it protects cellular protein thiol groups, which would otherwise become covalently modified; when all GSH has been spent, NAPQI begins to react with the cellular proteins, killing the cells in the process. The preferred treatment for an overdose of this painkiller is the administration of N-acetyl-L-cysteine (either via oral or IV administration)), which is processed by cells to L-cysteine and used in the de novo synthesis of GSH.

See also 
Cytochrome P450 oxidase
Liver failure
Centrilobular necrosis

References

External links 

Cytochrome P-450 Inducers, Inhibitors, and Substrates

Human drug metabolites
Chemical pathology
Hepatotoxins
Imines
Toxins